The 2014–15 Club Tijuana season was the 68th professional season of Mexico's top-flight football league. The season is split into two tournaments—the Torneo Apertura and the Torneo Clausura—each with identical formats and each contested by the same eighteen teams. Tijuana began their season on July 17, 2014 against Puebla, Tijuana plays their homes games on Fridays at 19:30pm local time.

Torneo Apertura 2014

First-team squad

 
For recent transfers, see List of Mexican football transfers winter 2013–14.

Regular season

Apertura 2014 results

Goalscorers

Regular season

Note: Those 21 goals include an own goal

Results

Results summary

Apertura 2014 Copa MX

Group stage

Apertura results

Goalscorers

Torneo Clausura 2015

First-team squad

Regular season

Clausura 2015 results

Goalscorers

Regular season

Results

Results summary

Clausura 2015 Copa MX

Group stage

Clausura results

Note: Tijuana originally won the first leg 3–1 but Tijuana was later awarded a 3–0 win after Necaxa only had 6 registered Ascenso MX players available for the leg instead of the mandatory 8.

Quarterfinals

Clausura results

Goalscorers

References

Club Tijuana
Puebla